Ruth Rosekrans Hoffman (7 January 1926 - 26 September 2007) was an American children's book illustrator and painter, known as Rosekrans Hoffman professionally.

Early life
Ruth Olive Rosekrans was born at her parents’ home on 7 January 1926 in Denton, Nebraska. She was the second child of James Charles, a contractor, and Pearl D Rosekrans, née Hocking.

She began drawing at the age of three or four. When she was seven she contracted osteomyelitis, a bone infection only treatable at that time by painful bone drains. She had to stay in a full body cast, with only her arms and hands free, for 18 months. It was during this period that she began to develop her artistic abilities. She began by copying newspaper comic strips from the Lincoln Star newspaper including Tillie the Toiler, Dick Tracy, Mutt and Jeff and Popeye.

She said the experience “gave me a new perspective on life… in bed in the body cast, horizontal, I saw things I wouldn’t ordinarily see. I wasn’t a child looking up, but more like a part of the land. From my prone position, I used to eye my food like an explorer surveying the horizon. Piles of mashed potatoes took on the proportions of mountains against the skyline. Undersides of chins, nostrils, palms jumped out at me. I studied expressions, the details of wallpaper, and tiny hairs peeking out of people’s ears.”

She would spend many more months in partial casts, a wheelchair, and homemade braces that her father invented to enable her to become more mobile. She used a walking stick for the rest of her life.

Education
She recovered sufficiently to attend Denton School District 136, graduating from Denton High School in 1945. She studied art at the University of Nebraska-Lincoln where she was “strongly influenced” by her teacher, the muralist and painter Kady Faulkner. She was a member of Delta Phi Delta, a national art honorary society. She gained a Bachelor of Fine Arts in 1948, after which she took graduate work at Penn State.

Personal life
In 1949 she married Mervyn L Cadwallader in Lancaster, Nebraska. They moved to California so that he could complete his PhD in history at the University of California, Berkeley. She spent her time painting, and studying with Japanese-American painter, photographer and printmaker Yasuo Kuniyoshi. In 1952 they were living on Hall Street, Brooklyn, New York.

By 1955 she and Cadwallader had divorced and she married Robert Hoffman in New York City. They bonded over a shared love of jazz. During this period she wrote “a lot of letters” to the City Council encouraging them to make buildings more accessible. About this endeavor she said, “So many buildings were built without access by ramp or rail for the handicapped. I think it was the feeling of those times that the handicapped should be put away out of sight.” In an interview from 1978 she "takes credit" for initiating a change in the city's views on accessibility.

In the early 1970s they built a home in West Haven, Connecticut which they shared with a pet cat, Boy, who appeared in many of her illustrations.

After Robert's retirement in 1991 they moved to Lincoln, Nebraska where she became active in local community life. She was a member of Denton Community Historical Society (DCHS), and a supporter of the Nebraska Literary Heritage Association, the Junior League of Lincoln, Lincoln City Public Library's Heritage Room and the University Place Art Center (now Lux Center for the Arts).

When Robert died in 1999, she moved to a nursing home in David City, Nebraska.

Early work
She held several art-related jobs before becoming a full-time illustrator of children's books. She worked as an artist for Balco Research Inc. in Newark, New Jersey, in New York's City Planning Office and for Addison Wesley Publishing Co.

Her paintings were exhibited at the Whitney Museum and the Brooklyn Museum. She stopped painting around 1972 to focus on drawing. One reason for the change was the physical exertion required to stand for long periods.

Full time artist
She became a full time artist in 1972, working under the name Rosekrans Hoffman, because “it’s simpler”. Her agent was Helen Wohlberg of Kirchoff/Wohlberg Inc. New York.

Hoffman was always careful to say that she was an artist, and not an illustrator. To her, this meant that the integrity of her artistic vision came first. She spent little time looking at others’ books for children, and whenever she illustrated a book, she favoured the usual publishers’ practice of keeping the author and illustrator completely separate until the launch.

Her work was influenced by her childhood in Nebraska, and the Dust Bowl of the early 1930s. ‘Washed-out’ shades tended to dominate her illustrations – dusty browns, mauves, ochres and dying yellows; she called them “old world” colours. Her characters were described as “peculiar, unique and slightly out-of-proportion, but never cute.” Of her style, she said “I work primarily with ink on fine pen points and turn corners where I have never been.”

She advised two-term US Poet Laureate Ted Kooser on his first children's book Bag in the Wind (finally published 2010) after it received a “lukewarm” reception from children's book publishers. Her advice was to remove much of Kooser's descriptive text, and leave it to the illustrator to create the imagery.

Collections and Exhibitions
Her work is in the following collections

 Heritage Room, Lincoln Public Library, Nebraska
 Joslyn Art Museum, Omaha
 Museum of Nebraska Art, Kearney
 Whitney Museum of American Art, New York City, New York
 Brooklyn Museum, Brooklyn, New York
 Kerlan Collection, University of Minnesota

Her work was exhibited in the following venues:
 Haydon Art Center, Lincoln, Nebraska
 Sheldon Memorial Art Gallery, Nebraska
 New York City Center Gallery, New York
 Bennett Martin Public Library, Nebraska
 Elder Gallery, Nebraska Wesleyan University
 University Place Art Center (Lux Center for the Arts), Lincoln, Nebraska

Publications

Author and Illustrator
 Anna Banana (1975)
 Sweet Sister Ella (1982)

Illustrator
 Walter in Love (1973) by Alicen White
 Where Did That Naughty Little Hamster Go? (1974) by Patty Wolcott
 Alexandra the Rock Eater: An Old Rumanian Tale Retold (1978) by Dorothy Van Woerkom – nominated for a Caldecott Medal
 An Egg Is To Sit On (1978) by Christine Tanz
 My Mother Sends Her Wisdom (1979) by Louise McClenathan
 Go to Bed! A Book of Bedtime Poems (1979) by Lee Bennett Hopkins
 Elves, Fairies & Gnomes: Poems (1980) selected by Lee Bennett Hopkins
 Come Home, Wilma (1980) by Mitchell Sharmat
 The Case of the Missing Hat: Starring Jim Henson’s Muppet's (1982) by Greg Williams
 The Easter Pig (1982) by Louise McClenathan
 The Truth About the Moon (1983) by Clayton Bess
 How Do You Make an Elephant Float? And Other Delicious Riddles (1983) by Lee Bennett Hopkins
 Creepy, Crawly Critter Riddles (1986) by Joanne E. Bernstein and Paul Cohen Whitman
 Three Sisters (1986) by Audrey Wood
 The Horrible Holidays (1988) by Audrey Wood
 Sue Patch and the Crazy Clocks (1989) by Ann Tompert
 Jet Black Pick-Up Truck (1990) by Pat Lakin
 The Best Cat Suit of All (1991) by Sylvia Cassedy 
 Jane Yolen’s Mother Goose Songbook (1992) by Jane Yolen, musical arrangements Adam Stemple
 Where Do Little Girls Grow? (1993) by Milly Jane Limmer
 Jane Yolen’s Old MacDonald Songbook (1994) by Jane Yolen
 Another New Day (1995) by Brian Potter and Wayne Green
 Pignic: An Alphabet in Rhyme (1996) by Anne Miranda
 Mr Wink (1996) by Claire Daniel and Elfrieda H. Hiebert
 Delilah Drinkwater and the Clever Cloud (1997)  by Marcia Vaughan

Textbooks
Hoffman produced many textbook illustrations “because texts make more money.” She worked with publishers including Houghton Mifflin, McGraw Hill Education, Open Court, Scholastic and Zaner-Bloser.

Other
She created a Christmas card each year, many of which are stored in the History Nebraska collection, in Lincoln, Nebraska. She also designed a poster for New York's Children's Book Council Anytime, Anyplace, Any Book campaign in 1981.

Awards and honours
 Caldecott Medal nominee for Alexandra the Rock Eater (1978)
 Established Pearl Rosekrans Memorial Scholarship in honour of her mother, awarded to an art student at Nebraska Wesleyan University (1978)
 Society of Illustrators member for Come Home, Wilma (1980)
 The Nebraska Literary Heritage Association sponsored a dinner honouring Hoffman in the Rotunda of the Nebraska State Capitol (1983)
 Outstanding Alumni Achievement Award in Art (1999) by UNL College of Fine Art, Nebraska

References

External links
Denton Community Historical Society
Nebraska Writers, Lincoln City Library 
de Grummond Collection, McCain Library and Archives, University of Southern Mississippi 
Museum of Nebraska Art (MONA) 

1926 births
2007 deaths
Artists from Lincoln, Nebraska
Artists from Nebraska
University of Nebraska–Lincoln alumni
American children's book illustrators
Women illustrators
American women illustrators
Children's book illustrators
20th-century women artists
20th-century American women artists
American women painters
Women painters
American women children's writers